The canton of Replonges is an administrative division of the Ain department, in eastern France. It was created at the French canton reorganisation which came into effect in March 2015. Its seat is in Replonges.

It consists of the following communes:
 
Arbigny 
Asnières-sur-Saône
Bâgé-Dommartin
Bâgé-le-Châtel
Boissey
Boz
Chavannes-sur-Reyssouze
Chevroux
Courtes
Curciat-Dongalon
Feillens
Gorrevod
Lescheroux
Mantenay-Montlin
Manziat
Ozan
Pont-de-Vaux
Replonges
Reyssouze
Saint-André-de-Bâgé
Saint-Bénigne
Saint-Étienne-sur-Reyssouze
Saint-Jean-sur-Reyssouze
Saint-Julien-sur-Reyssouze
Saint-Nizier-le-Bouchoux
Saint-Trivier-de-Courtes
Sermoyer
Servignat
Vernoux
Vescours
Vésines

References

Cantons of Ain